Top Floor Girl is a 1959 British drama film directed by Max Varnel and starring Kay Callard, Neil Hallett and Robert Raikes. The screenplay was co-written by Brian Clemens.

Premise
A ruthlessly ambitious woman becomes involved with the son of a wealthy man, but begins to have regrets about abandoning her previous lover.

Cast
 Kay Callard ... Connie
 Neil Hallett ... Dave
 Robert Raikes ... Bob
 Maurice Kaufmann ... Peter Farnite
 Brian Nissen ... Stevens Jr.
 Diana Chesney ... Miss Prentice
 Liz Fraser ... Mabel
 Arnold Bell ... Stevens Sr.
 William Hodge ... Farnite Sr.
 Hal Osmond (uncredited)

References

External links

1959 films
1959 drama films
British drama films
Films directed by Max Varnel
1950s English-language films
1950s British films